Jeffrey Paul Rake is an American television producer and writer. He is known for his work on Boston Legal and creating the NBC shows Manifest, The Mysteries of Laura and Miss Match.

Biography 
Rake was born in Philadelphia and grew up in Encino, Los Angeles. He attended Harvard-Westlake School and graduated from Columbia University in 1990. He was the president of Columbia College Student Council during his senior year. At Columbia, he was also a classmate of television producer Gina Fattore and Academy Award-winning film producer Dede Gardner.

He received a J.D. degree from UC Berkeley School of Law, where he was a finalist in the James Patterson McBaine Honors Moot Court Competition and an executive editor of the California Law Review.

After graduating from law school, Rake clerked for two federal judges  and joined one of L.A.'s top law firms. During his tenure as a lawyer, he took a leave of absence and wrote the musical Hound Dog: A hip hOpera, an alternative history of Elvis Presley starring Wayne Brady. The play premiered in 1996 in Los Angeles.

Rake then entered the television business and co-created the Fox series The Street in 2000. He then put his legal knowledge to work by writing and producing episodes of Boston Legal and The Practice. He co-wrote the pilot for Boston Legal, co-created the series Miss Match and The Mysteries of Laura.

In 2017, he created Manifest. The show was initially cancelled, but was picked up by Netflix and became the third show to reach 100 days in Netflix's Top 10 charts. In August 2021, the show was renewed for a fourth season.

Los Angeles Times called him a member of the "Ex-Lawyers Club," a group of television showrunners, producers, and writers who were once lawyers before switching careers and joining the entertainment industry. Other ex-lawyers named by the Times were David E. Kelley, Carol Mendelsohn, Richard Appel, and Stephen Engel.

Personal life and family 
Rake is married to Paulette Light, executive director of the Charles Bronfman prize, who he met in college.

Filmography

References

External links
 

Living people
People from Philadelphia
People from Encino, Los Angeles
Columbia College (New York) alumni
Harvard-Westlake School alumni
American television producers
American television writers
American television directors
UC Berkeley School of Law alumni
Lawyers from Los Angeles
1966 births